Tapping is a guitar-playing technique.

Tapping may also refer to:

 Tapping, Western Australia, a suburb of Perth
 Rubber tapping, the process by which latex is collected from a rubber tree
 Telephone tapping, or wire tapping, the monitoring of telephone and internet conversations 
 Tapping or flapping, a change in the pronunciation of /t/ or /d/ in some types of English
 Tapping, the process of cutting or forming threads using a tap and die
 Tapping, touching a touchscreen
Pointing device gesture
 Tapping and untapping, a game mechanic in Magic:The Gathering
 Tapping, a method of cheating in online games
 Emotional Freedom Techniques, also known as "tapping", a pseudoscience that claims to have health benefits

People
Amanda Tapping (born 1965), an English-Canadian actress
Callum Tapping (born 1993), a Scottish footballer

See also

Tap (disambiguation)